Edgar Township is one of fifteen townships in Edgar County, Illinois, USA.  As of the 2010 census, its population was 482 and it contained 210 housing units.  Previously named Bloomfield Township, it received its current name on May 9, 1857.

Geography
The township is rural, with no incorporated towns or villages. Several unincorporated hamlets (Edgar, Horace, and Bloomfield) are located in the township. The townhouse is located at Edgar.

Unincorporated towns
 Edgar

Extinct towns
 Bloomfield
 Horace
 Wetzel

Cemeteries
The township contains these six cemeteries: Bloomfield, Cherry Point, Franklin, Hoult, McKee and Scott.

Demographics

Transportation

The township is served by several major state and federal highways.  US Route 36 forms the northern boundary of the township, while Illinois Route 1 and US Route 150 cuts a north–south path through the township.  The Edgar County Airport is located in the southeast part of the township.  CSX operates a north–south length of railroad track that connects Chrisman and Paris.

Education

The township is served by three school districts: Shiloh Community Unit School District #1, Chrisman-Scottland Community Unit School District #6, and Crestwood Community Unit School District #4.

Political districts
 Illinois's 15th congressional district
 State House District 109
 State Senate District 55

References
 
 United States Census Bureau 2007 TIGER/Line Shapefiles
 United States National Atlas

External links
 City-Data.com
 Illinois State Archives
 Edgar County Official Site

Townships in Edgar County, Illinois
Townships in Illinois